Raymond 'Ray' Russell (born 4 April 1947) is an English session musician who is primarily a guitarist. He is also a record producer and composer.

In 1973 he was a member of the band Mouse, which released a progressive rock album entitled Lady Killer for the Sovereign record label. His TV compositions have included A Touch of Frost, Bergerac, Plain Jane, A Bit of a Do, Rich Tea and Sympathy, The Inspector Alleyn Mysteries, Dangerfield and Grafters, as well as many other British and American television programmes. He also played in the DVD Simon Phillips Returns with Simon Phillips and Anthony Jackson.

With colleagues Mo Foster and Ralph Salmins, Russell gives musical seminars at UK educational establishments.

In 2008 Russell, drummer Ralph Salmins, and sound engineer Rik Walton created Made Up Music, a music library that distributes music on its web site and by sending portable hard drives to music editors. The company sells music by Russell, Mo Foster, Steve Donnelly, and Simon Eyre.

In March 2020 Russell featured on an episode of the BBC Television programme Antiques Roadshow, in which his fretless six-string electric guitar, made by Bartell and gifted to him by George Harrison, having originally belonged to John Lennon, was valued at £300,000-£400,000.

Solo discography
 Turn Circle (CBS, 1968) 
 Dragon Hill (CBS, 1969) 
 June 11, 1971: Live at the ICA (RCA Victor, 1971) 
 Rites & Rituals (CBS, 1971) 
 Secret Asylum (Black Lion, 1973) 
 Ready or Not (DJM, 1977) 
 This Side Up (B&W, 1989)
 A Table Near the Band (Angel Air, 1990)
 Guitars from Mars (Virgin, 1990) 
 Why Not Now (1988)
 Childscape (1990) with Gil Evans and Mark Isham
 June 11th 1971: Live at the ICA / Retrospective (Mokai, 2000) 
 A Touch of Frost (Universal, 2003) 
 The Composer's Cut (Angel Air, 2005)
 Goodbye Svengali (Cuneiform, 2006)
 Myths & Legends (Strip Sounds, 2007)
 Now, More Than Ever (Abstract Logix, 2013)
 The Celestial Squid with Henry Kaiser (Cuneiform, 2015)

References

External links 

Made Up Music website
EP Music Licensing website
BBC Review of Goodbye Svengali
Wire magazine (Issue #262, December 2005): Ray Russell track on giveaway CD

1947 births
Living people
People from Islington (district)
Musicians from London
Cuneiform Records artists
English television composers
English male composers
English jazz guitarists
English male guitarists
English session musicians
Nucleus (band) members
British male jazz musicians
RMS (band) members
Black Lion Records artists